Andrejs Piedels (born 17 September 1970 in Jēkabpils) is a former Latvian football goalkeeper.

Career
As a player, he played for Pārdaugava, Daugava, Amstrig, DAG, Skonto FC, FK Jūrmala, FK Daugava Riga and Olimps/RFS.

He collected 14 caps for Latvia national football team and participated at Euro 2004.

External links
 Latvian Football Federation (in Latvian)

1970 births
Living people
People from Jēkabpils
Latvian footballers
Latvia international footballers
UEFA Euro 2004 players
Skonto FC players
Daugava Rīga players
JFK Olimps players
Association football goalkeepers
FK RFS players
Association football goalkeeping coaches